Alice Nitka (born 1944) is an American politician and member of the Vermont Senate, where she represents the Windsor District which includes Ludlow, Vermont. A member of the Democratic Party, she serves as vice chair of the Senate Committee on Appropriations.

Nitka is married and has two daughters.

References

Women state legislators in Vermont
1944 births
Living people
People from Ludlow (town), Vermont
Place of birth missing (living people)
Democratic Party Vermont state senators
21st-century American politicians
21st-century American women politicians